Nima Sangay  is a Bhutanese international footballer, currently playing for Druk Pol. He made his first appearance for the Bhutan national football team in 2005.

Career statistics

International goals

References

Bhutanese footballers
Bhutan international footballers
Druk Pol F.C. players
Living people
1984 births
People from Thimphu
Association football midfielders